Fantasies is a 1981 R-rated English language drama film produced in West Germany. Directed by John Derek, the film starred his wife Kathleen Collins (really Mary Cathleen Collins; later known as Bo Derek). Co-stars included Peter Hooten, Anna Alexiadi, Faidon Georgitsis, Nikos Pashalidis, and Kostas Baladimas, with vocals by Walter Willison.<ref>[http://www.people.com/people/archive/article/0,,20075797,00.html David Sheff "A Hollywood Ten, February 11, 1980 People Magazine] accessed 15 November 2013</ref>

OverviewFantasies was filmed and produced on an extremely low budget in Greece in 1974. Filming lasted just over ten days. However, the film was not released until 1981, two years after Bo Derek had already become a movie fantasy girl and international star after her breakthrough performance in the comedy 10 (1979).

Director Derek and the underage Collins began a romantic affair during filming, leading to the dissolution of his marriage to then-wife Linda Evans. Derek wed Collins on June 10, 1976, after which she became internationally known as Bo Derek.

Originally titled Once Upon a Love, producer Kevin Castleman had the unreleased film re-edited and added a new soundtrack with vocals and lyrics by Tony Award nominee Walter Willison and music by Jeffrey Silverman, and released it in the US with the new title Fantasies. The film found greater success around the world, released under various titles, including the original Once Upon a Love in the UK, and Femme'' in France.

Plot

Cast
Bo Derek as Anastasia   (credited as Kathleen Collins)
Peter Hooten as Damir
Anna Alexiadis as Mayor 
Phaedon Georgitsis as Photographer 
Nikos Pashalidis as Priest
Kostas Baladimas as Godfather
Therese Bohlin as Model 
Boucci Simis as Beautifuloni 
Viennoula Koussathana as Saleslady

References

External links

1981 drama films
1981 films
Films shot in Greece
American drama films
Films directed by John Derek
Films with screenplays by John Derek
1980s English-language films
1980s American films